The Senate of the Republic, or simply the Senate, is the upper house of the bicameral Italian Parliament (the other being the Chamber of Deputies). The two houses together form a perfect bicameral system, meaning they perform identical functions, but do so separately. Pursuant to the Articles 57, 58, and 59 of the Italian Constitution, the Senate has 200 elective members, of which 196 are elected from Italian constituencies, and 4 from Italian citizens living abroad. Furthermore, there is a small number (currently 6) of senators for life (senatori a vita), either appointed or ex officio. It was established in its current form on 8 May 1948, but previously existed during the Kingdom of Italy as Senato del Regno (Senate of the Kingdom), itself a continuation of the Senato Subalpino (Subalpine Senate) of Sardinia established on 8 May 1848. Members of the Senate are styled Senator or The Honourable Senator (Italian: Onorevole Senatore) and they meet at Palazzo Madama, Rome.

Composition 

Article 57 of the Constitution of Italy originally established that the Senate of the Republic was to be elected on a regional basis by Italian citizens aged 25 or older (unlike the Chamber of the Deputies, which was elected on a national basis and by all Italian citizens aged 18 or older). No region could have less than 7 senators, except for the two smallest regions: Aosta Valley (1 senator) and Molise (2 senators). From 2006 to 2020, 6 out of 315 senators (and 12 out of 630 deputies) were elected by Italians residing abroad.

After two constitutional amendments were passed respectively in 2020 (by constitutional referendum) and 2021, however, there have been changes. The Senate is still elected on a regional basis, but the number of senators was reduced from 315 to 200, who are now elected by all citizens aged 18 or older, just like deputies (themselves being reduced from 630 to 400). Italians residing abroad now elect 4 senators (and 8 deputies).

The remaining 196 senators are assigned to each region proportionally according to their population. The amended Article 57 of the Constitution provides that no region can have fewer than 3 senators representing it, barring Aosta Valley and Molise, which retained 1 and 2 senators respectively.

The senators for life are composed of former presidents of the Italian Republic who hold office ex officio, and up to five citizens who are appointed by Presidents of Italy "for outstanding merits in the social, scientific, artistic or literary field". The current life senators are:

The current term of the Senate is five years, except for senators for life that hold their office for their lifetime. Until a Constitutional change on 9 February 1963, the Senate was elected for six-year terms. The Senate may be dissolved before the expiration of its normal term by the president of the Republic (e.g. when no government can obtain a majority).

Electoral system and election of the Senate 

According to article 58 of the Italian constitution, Italian citizens aged 18 onwards (until 2021 25 years) are enabled to vote for the Senate.

The electoral system is a parallel voting system, with 37% of seats allocated using first-past-the-post voting (FPTP) and 63% using proportional representation, allocated with the largest remainder method, with one round of voting.

The 200 elected senators are elected in:
 74 in single-member constituencies, by plurality;
 122 in multi-member constituencies, by regional proportional representation;
 4 in multi-member abroad constituencies, by constituency proportional representation.

For Italian residents, each house members are elected by single ballots, including the constituency candidate and his/her supporting party lists. In each single-member constituency the deputy/senator is elected on a plurality basis, while the seats in multi-member constituencies will be allocated nationally. In order to be calculated in single-member constituency results, parties need to obtain at least 1% of the national vote. In order to receive seats in multi-member constituencies, parties need to obtain at least 3% of the national vote. Elects from multi-member constituencies will come from closed lists. The single voting paper, containing both first-past-the-post candidates and the party lists, shows the names of the candidates to single-member constituencies and, in close conjunction with them, the symbols of the linked lists for the proportional part, each one with a list of the relative candidates.

The voter can cast their vote in three different ways:

 Drawing a sign on the symbol of a list: in this case the vote extends to the candidate in the single-member constituency which is supported by that list.
 Drawing a sign on the name of the candidate of the single-member constituency and another one on the symbol of one list that supports them: the result is the same as that described above; it is not allowed, under penalty of annulment, the panachage, so the voter can not vote simultaneously for a candidate in the FPTP constituency and for a list which is not linked to them.
 Drawing a sign only on the name of the candidate for the FPTP constituency, without indicating any list: in this case, the vote is valid for the candidate in the single-member constituency and also automatically extended to the list that supports them; if that candidate is however connected to several lists, the vote is divided proportionally between them, based on the votes that each one has obtained in that constituency.

Reform proposals 
In 2016, the Italian Parliament passed a constitutional law that "effectively abolishes the Senate as an elected chamber and sharply restricts its ability to veto legislation". The law was rejected on 4 December 2016 by a referendum, leaving the Senate unchanged.

Membership 

The membership of the Senate following the 2022 Italian general election:

Presidents

Under the current Constitution, the Senate must hold its first sitting no later than 20 days after a general election. That session, presided by the oldest senator, proceeds to elect the president of the Senate for the following parliamentary period. On the first two attempts at voting, an absolute majority of all senators is needed; if a third round is needed, a candidate can be elected by an absolute majority of the senators present and voting. If this third round fails to produce a winner, a final ballot is held between the two senators with the highest votes in the previous ballot. In the case of a tie, the elder senator is deemed the winner.

In addition to overseeing the business of the chamber, chairing and regulating debates, deciding whether motions and bills are admissible, representing the Senate, etc.,  the president of the Senate stands in for the president of the Republic when the latter is unable to perform the duties of the office; in this case the Senate is headed by a vice president.

The current president of the Senate is Ignazio La Russa.

Historical composition

Since 1994

Palazzo Madama

Since 1871, the Senate has met in Palazzo Madama in Rome, an old patrician palace completed in 1505 for the Medici family. The palace takes its name from Madama Margherita of Austria, daughter of Charles V and wife of Alessandro de' Medici. After the extinction of the Medici, the palace was handed over to the House of Lorraine. and, later, it was sold to Papal Government.

Later, in 1755, Pope Benedict XIV (whose coat of arms still dominates the main entrance) ordered major restructuring, entrusting the work to Luigi Hostini. In the following years there were installed the court offices and police headquarters. In 1849, Pius IX moved the Ministries of Finances and of the Public Debt here, as well as the Papal Post Offices. After the conquest of Rome by the newly formed Kingdom of Italy, the palace was chosen to become the seat of the Senato del Regno (Senate of the Kingdom).

Palazzo Madama and the adjacent buildings underwent further restructuring and adaptation in the first decades of the 20th century. A radical transformation which involved, among other things, the modernization of the hemicycle, the full remaking of the prospectus on Via San Salvatore and Via Dogana Vecchia, and the establishment of a connection with the adjacent Palazzo Carpegna. The latter, owned by the Senate, was entirely rebuilt in an advanced position compared to its original position. The small church of San Salvatore in Thermis, dating to the 6th century, which stood in the street to the left of the palace, was first closed, expropriated and later razed for security reasons.

The current façade was built in the mid-1650s by both Cigoli and Paolo Maruccelli. The latter added the ornate cornice and whimsical decorative urns on the roof. Among the rooms one of the most significant (and perhaps the most impressive from the political point of view) is the "Sala Maccari," which takes its name from Cesare Maccari, the artist who decorated it in 1880 and created the frescoes, among which stands out the one that depicts Cicero making his indictment of Catiline, who listens isolated.

The chamber where the Senate met for the first time on 27 November 1871 was designed by Luigi Gabet. A plaque on the wall behind the speaker's chair commemorates the king's address to Parliament when first convened in the new seat of government:

Above this has been placed a plaque bearing the inscription:

To the viewers' left stand the flags of the Italian Republic (with a ribbon embroidered with the words SENATO DELLA REPUBBLICA) and the European Union.

See also
Parliament of Italy
Italian Chamber of Deputies
Senate
Roman Senate
Senato Italiano (TV channel)
Senators for life in Italy

Notes

References

External links

 
 

1848 establishments in Italy
Senate
Italy